USS R-23 (SS-100) was an R-class coastal and harbor defense submarine built for the United States Navy during World War I.

Description
The R-boats built by Lake Torpedo Boat Company (R-21 through R-27) are sometimes considered a separate class from those of the other builders. They displaced  on the surface and  submerged. The R-class submarines had a crew of 3 officers and 23 enlisted men.

For surface running, the boats were powered by two  diesel engines, each driving one propeller shaft. When submerged each propeller was driven by a  electric motor. They could reach  on the surface and  underwater.

The boats were armed with four 21-inch (53.3 cm) torpedo tubes in the bow. They carried four reloads, for a total of eight torpedoes. The R-class submarines were also armed with a single 3"/50 caliber deck gun.

Construction and career
R-23 was laid down on 25 April 1917 by the Lake Torpedo Boat Company in Bridgeport, Connecticut. She was launched on 5 November 1918 sponsored by Miss Ruth Jane Harris, and commissioned on 23 October 1919. A little over a month after commissioning, R-23 departed New London, Connecticut, for her homeport of Coco Solo, Panama Canal Zone. Given hull classification symbol SS-100 in July 1920, she was based in the Canal Zone, interrupting her service there only for overhaul periods at Balboa and on the East Coast. She returned to the United States for inactivation in the fall of 1924, arriving Philadelphia, Pennsylvania, on 1 December. R-23 was decommissioned on 24 April 1925 after only five-and-a-half years of service. She was berthed at League Island until struck from the Naval Vessel Register on 9 May 1930 and sold for scrap in July of the same year.

Notes

References

External links
 

Ships built in Bridgeport, Connecticut
United States R-class submarines
1918 ships